Low Gill railway station served the hamlet of Lowgill, Westmorland (now in Cumbria), England, from 1846 to 1966 on the Lancaster and Carlisle Railway.

History 
The first station opened on 17 December 1846 by the Lancaster and Carlisle Railway. A second station opened as Low Gill Junction on 16 September 1861, at the junction of the railway's Ingleton branch line with the main line, rendering the first station useless so it closed on 1 November 1861. The suffix "Junction" was dropped from the second station's name in 1883 when the London and North Western Railway took over the line. It closed on 7 March 1960 and closed to goods on 26 July 1966.

References

External links 

Disused railway stations in Cumbria
Railway stations in Great Britain opened in 1842
Railway stations in Great Britain closed in 1861
Railway stations in Great Britain opened in 1861
Railway stations in Great Britain closed in 1960
1846 establishments in England
1966 disestablishments in England